Sheikh Mohamed Fankaty Dabo (born 11 October 1995) is an English professional footballer who plays as a right-back for Coventry City.

Club career
Dabo began his career with Chelsea. On 11 January 2017, along with Chelsea teammates Charlie Colkett and Islam Feruz, Dabo joined League One side Swindon Town on loan for the remainder of the 2016–17 season. Three days later, Dabo made his Swindon Town debut in a 2–1 away victory against Bolton Wanderers, featuring for the entire 90 minutes. On 5 February 2017, Dabo scored his first goal for Swindon in their local derby against Oxford United.

On 25 June 2017, Dabo joined Dutch side Vitesse on a season-long loan. In August 2018 Dabo returned on loan to the Netherlands, this time with Sparta Rotterdam.

On 5 June 2019, it was announced that Dabo would join Coventry City on a three-year deal after his Chelsea contract expired on 1 July. Dabo won Coventry's 2019–20 'Player of the Year' award.

International career
Dabo was born in England and is of Sierra Leonean descent. He has represented England at under-16, under-17 and under-20 youth levels.

Career statistics

Honours
Individual
PFA Team of the Year: 2019–20 League One

References

1995 births
Living people
English footballers
England youth international footballers
English sportspeople of Sierra Leonean descent
Chelsea F.C. players
Swindon Town F.C. players
SBV Vitesse players
Sparta Rotterdam players
Coventry City F.C. players
English Football League players
Association football defenders
English expatriate footballers
English expatriate sportspeople in the Netherlands
Expatriate footballers in the Netherlands
Eredivisie players
Eerste Divisie players